Marklohe is a municipality in Lower Saxony, Germany.

Geography

Geographical location 
The municipality of Marklohe is located 5 km from Nienburg on the opposite side of the river Weser and midway between Verden (Aller) and Minden. Marklohe is the administrative seat of the Samtgemeinde Weser-Aue.

Municipality structure 
The municipality of Marklohe belongs to a district that directly adjoins the district of Lemke and Wohlenhausen, and is about 1,5 km from the district of Ortsteil Oyle.

History 
In 1931 the town changed from its original name, Lohe, to Marklohe. The speculation was that the central gathering place, Marklohe, was called Marklo by the pre-Christian Saxons. That idea could not be certified.

Politics

Municipal government 
The municipal government of Marklohe consists of 15 council men and council women.
CDU 6 Seats
SPD 6 Seats
The Greens 2 Seats
FWG 1 Seat
(As of municipal elections on 11 September 2011)

Mayor 
In the current local election period (2011-2016), Günther Ballandat (SPD) serves as the honorary mayor of the municipality.

Culture and items of interest 
There is an open-air theater in Marklohe.  It is the home of the Amateur Players Association of Marklohe, and is operated by volunteers.  Each summer they present Low German dialect play.

The association is also active in the winter months.  Here, in the France Guest House in Marklohe the horn works of Nienburg (Weser) are played.

Buildings 
The church of St. Clement of Rome was built in the 12th century and has wall paintings and carvings in the choir.

Economy and infrastructure 
The community is located just off the route 214.  The route runs from Nienburg/Weser to Sulingen, and Bundesstraße 6 from Nienburg/Wesser to Bremen.

Climate
Climate in this area has mild differences between highs and lows, and there is adequate rainfall year-round.  The Köppen Climate Classification subtype for this climate is "Cfb". (Marine West Coast Climate/Oceanic climate).

Personalities 
 Hans Adolf von Arenstorff (1895–1952), Major-General and landowner
 Magdalene Thimme (1880–1951), German educator and opponent to National Socialism
 William Thimme (1879–1966), German theologian and professor

References

External links 
 Municipality website

Nienburg (district)